Bare Knuckle Fighting Championship (BKFC) is an American bare-knuckle boxing promotion based in Philadelphia. BKFC is the first promotion to hold an official state-sanctioned and commissioned bare-knuckle boxing event in the United States since 1889. Its first event was held in 2018, with 24 "numbered" events held as of April 2022. It is the largest bare knuckle boxing promotion company in the world, and has featured notable talents such as Luis Palomino, Elvin Leon Brito, Jim Alers, Artem Lobov, Ricco Rodriguez, Charles Bennett, Kendall Grove, Chris Lytle, Joe Riggs, Chase Sherman, Leonard Garcia, Eric Prindle, Joey Beltran, Bec Rawlings, Shannon Ritch, Bobby Gunn, Jason Knight, Johnny Bedford, Paulie Malignaggi, Steve Banks, Sirimongkol Singmanasak, Buakaw Banchamek, Saenchai, Robert Morrow, and Chris Leben .

History
BKFC was founded in April 2018 and is presided over by former American professional boxer David Feldman. After first receiving approval to hold a sanctioned event in Cheyenne, Wyoming, BKFC held the first state sanctioned bare-knuckle boxing event in the United States since 1889. Each fight takes place in a specialized circular four-rope ring, referred to as the "Squared Circle.” BKFC 1, which took place on June 2, 2018, featured the first American sanctioned women's bare-knuckle fight in modern history. The Bare-Knuckle Boxing Hall of Fame recognized this milestone and awarded the victor of this contest, Bec Rawlings, with the National Police Gazette World Diamond Belt several days after her victory. BKFC recognizes the Police Gazette champions, and they may defend their titles within this promotion. At BKFC 3, Arnold Adams defeated Sam Shewmaker in the finals of an eight man tournament to be crowned as the inaugural BKFC Heavyweight Champion. This event also hosted the quarterfinals of a tournament to crown a Lightweight champion. In February, 2019, former UFC light heavyweight title contender Anthony Johnson announced that he will be joining the company in an administrative role.

On February 24, 2022, David Feldman announced on Ariel Helwani's show that TrillerNet had acquired a majority stake of BKFC, while not disclosing the value of the deal or percentages of the stake.

On June 24, 2022, Luis Palomino, Lightweight Champion, won the Welterweight Championship and becomes the first double champion in BKFC History.

In September 2022 it was announced by David Feldman that BKFC had acquired the U.K. based Bare Fist Boxing Association (BFBA) forming Bare Knuckle Fighting Championship UK (BKFC UK).

Death of Justin Thornton 
On August 20, 2021, BKFC was involved in controversy after the death of boxer Justin Thornton at BKFC 20.
Justin Thornton died as a result of spinal injury suffered during his BKFC debut. Thornton had been on a five-fight losing streak ahead of the fight. The matchmaking and regulations were criticised following the news on social media and by UFC president Dana White.

Broadcasting partners
Initially, BKFC pay-per-view bouts were carried worldwide via FITE TV. On July 24, 2020 it was announced that starting on August, DAZN will be streaming BKFC events. In February 2023, Fite announced to include all events to its Fite+ subscription service.

Unique ring

BKFC holds all bouts in a circular four-rope ring, referred to as the "Squared Circle". This ring incorporates elements of historical bare knuckle fighting by containing two scratch lines, three feet apart and in the middle of the ring. These scratch lines are based on the Broughton Rules, which governed bare knuckle fighting in the 19th century. It is a requirement that each fighter must start each round with their front foot on their scratch line. This is referred to as “Toe the Line”, and it is an instruction given to the fighters at the beginning of each round, followed by "Knuckle Up" which signals the beginning of the round.

List of selected BKFC events

List of BKFC events 
 2018 in Bare Knuckle Fighting Championship
 2019 in Bare Knuckle Fighting Championship
 2020 in Bare Knuckle Fighting Championship
 2021 in Bare Knuckle Fighting Championship
 2022 in Bare Knuckle Fighting Championship
 2023 in Bare Knuckle Fighting Championship

BKFC weight classes

Current champions

Championship history

Heavyweight Championship
Weight limit: above 210 lbs (95.3 kg)
The inaugural champion was determined by an 8-man tournament.

Cruiserweight Championship
Weight limit: 210 lbs (95.3 kg)

Light Heavyweight Championship
Weight limit: 190 lbs (86.2 kg)

Middleweight Championship
Weight limit: 175 lbs (79.3 kg)

Welterweight Championship
Weight limit: 165 lbs (74.8 kg)

Lightweight Championship
Weight limit: 155 lbs (70.3 kg)
The inaugural champion was determined by a 4-man tournament

Bantamweight Championship
Weight limit: 135 lbs (61.2 kg)
The inaugural champion was determined by an 8-man tournament.

Women's Flyweight Championship
Weight limit: 125 lbs (56.7 kg)

Women's Strawweight Championship
Weight limit: 115 lbs (52.2 kg)

Tournament winners

See also

List of boxing organisations
BYB Extreme Fighting Series

References

External links

Bare Knuckle Fighting Championship
Bare-knuckle boxing
Boxing organizations
2018 establishments in Pennsylvania
Sports organizations established in 2018